Treading Water may refer to:

 Treading water, a pattern of movement for a swimmer in water
 Treading Water (2001 film), a 2001 lesbian-themed American film
 Treading Water (2013 film), a 2013 Canadian-Mexican comedy-drama film
 "Treading Water" (Alex Clare song), a 2011 song
 "Treading Water" (Christoffer Kläfford song), a 2017 song
 "Treading Water", a 2020 song by the Vamps from their album Cherry Blossom